Kamilche Hill is a  peak in Mason County, Washington about  northwest of the Puget Sound community of Kamilche. The summit is within a large private forest owned by Simpson Timber Company. The peak has radio equipment including the KRXY transmitter.

References

Mountains of Washington (state)
Mountains of Mason County, Washington